The Sinicized Papora and Hoanya dialects constituted a Formosan language of Taiwan. They were spoken across the middle western side of the island, around Lishui, Chingshui, Shalu, and inland to Taichung.

Papora is also spelled Papola, Bupuran, Vupuran; another name is Hinapavosa.

References

Formosan languages
Languages of Taiwan
Extinct languages of Asia